Sosnovka is a rural locality (a selo) in Sosnovsky Selsoviet of Seryshevsky District, Amur Oblast, Russia. The population was 209 as of 2018. There are 15 streets.

Geography 
Sosnovka is located 33 km east of Seryshevo (the district's administrative centre) by road. Vernoye is the nearest rural locality.

References 

Rural localities in Seryshevsky District